Gao Yuan may refer to:

 Gao Yuan (高元), the legendary progenitor of the Gao clan
 Gao Yuan (高原), the author of Born Red
 Yeong-yang of Goguryeo (died 618), or Gao Yuan, king of Goguryeo